Greatest Day may refer to:
"Greatest Day" (Beverley Knight song)
"Greatest Day" (Take That song)

See also
Great Day (disambiguation)